Trinchesia caerulea is a species of sea slug, an aeolid nudibranch, a marine gastropod mollusc in the family Trinchesiidae.

Distribution
This species was described from Devon, England. It has been reported from the NE Atlantic from Norway south to Portugal and in the Mediterranean Sea. Records from Brazil and Florida probably represent a different species.

Description 
The typical size of this species is 10–15 mm and the maximum recorded length is 26 mm.

Habitat 
Found from the intertidal zone to 270 m. Trinchesia caerulea feeds on hydroids of the genus Sertularella.

References

External links
 

Trinchesiidae
Gastropods described in 1804